A mis 33 años ("To My 33 Years") is a 1977 album by Julio Iglesias. It was released on the Alhambra label.

Track listing

Charts

Weekly charts

Year-end charts

Certifications and sales

References

1977 albums
Julio Iglesias albums
Spanish-language albums